USS Grackle (AM-73) was a  minesweeper in the service of the United States Navy during World War II.

Grackle was laid down on 6 June 1929 as MV Notre Dame by the Bath Iron Works Corp. of Bath, Maine, for F. J. O'Hara and Sons, Inc. of Boston, Massachusetts. She was launched on 2 December 1929, delivered on 21 December 1929, and renamed Grackle on 14 August 1940. Acquired by the Navy on 16 September 1940, her conversion to a minesweeper began on 1 October 1940 at the Bethlehem Steel Co. of East Boston, Massachusetts. Grackle was commissioned on 4 February 1941, and her conversion completed on 15 March 1941.

World War II North Atlantic operations 
Following shakedown out of Yorktown, Virginia, and Newport, Rhode Island, USS Grackle departed Portland, Maine on 25 September 1941 for service in Newfoundland as a unit of Minesweeper Division 25, Squadron 9 of the Atlantic Fleet. Reaching Argentia, Newfoundland on 2 October, Grackle conducted minesweeping patrols from that port until 15 January 1942, and following repairs at Boston, Massachusetts she returned to sweeping duties at Argentia until the spring of 1944.

Post-War deactivation 
Grackle put in at Boston on 17 May 1944 and was decommissioned there on 25 August 1944. She was transferred to the Maritime Commission for disposal on 9 September 1946 and struck from the Naval Vessel Register on 16 September 1944. Final fate unknown.

References

External links 
 

World War II minesweepers of the United States
Ships built in Bath, Maine
1929 ships